Ashaway is an unincorporated village and census-designated place (CDP) in the town of Hopkinton, Rhode Island, USA. It is a principal village of Hopkinton, along with Hope Valley, although it is the smaller of the two. The population was 1,485 at the 2010 census.  The name Ashaway is derived from the American Indian name for the river that runs through the village, the Ashawague or Ashawaug, which means "land in the middle" or "land between" in the Niantic and Mohegan languages.  The name "Ashawague River" appears as late as 1832 on the Findley map of Rhode Island published in Philadelphia.

Geography
Ashaway is located at  (41.423004, −71.788839).

According to the United States Census Bureau, the CDP has a total area of 6.2 km2 (2.4 mi2). 6.2 km2 (2.4 mi2) of it is land and 0.1 km2 (0.04 mi2) (1.24%) is water.

Demographics

At the 2010 census, there were 1,485 people, 566 households, and 418 families residing in the CDP. The population density was 239.5/km2 (620.3/mi2). There were 617 housing units at an average density of 99.5/km2 (257.2/mi2). The racial make-up of the CDP was 94.14% White, 0.88% African American, 1.55% American Indian, 0.88% Asian and 1.48% from two or more races. Hispanic or Latino of any race were 2.83% of the population.

There were 566 households, of which 33.7% had children under the age of 18 living with them, 54.2% were married couples living together, 13.8% had a female householder with no husband present, 5.8% had a male householder with no wife present and 26.1% were non-families. Of all households, 21.0% were made up of individuals, and 8.8% had someone living alone who was 65 years of age or older. The average household size was 2.62 and the average family size was 3.01.

19% of the population were under the age of 18, 7.3% from 18 to 24, 24% from 25 to 44, 31% from 45 to 64 and 19% were 65 years of age or older. The median age was 42.3 years. There were 95.3 males for every 100 females, and 92.3 males age 18 and over for every 100 females age 18 and over.

The median household income in 2000 was $47,271 and the median family income was $49,125. Males had a median income of $41,375 and females $25,556. The per capita income was $21,149. About 6.6% of families and 7.9% of the population were below the poverty line, including 12.5% of those under age 18 and 9.6% of those age 65 or over.

Media 
Ashaway is the city of license for the radio station WSUB-LP, also known as 96.7 FM The Buzz. Its antenna is on top of the old Bradford Dyeing Association smokestack, but the designated city of license is Ashaway by the Federal Communications Commission. WSUB-LP is owned and operated by The Buzz Alternative Radio Foundation, Inc.

References

External links 
 

Census-designated places in Washington County, Rhode Island
Census-designated places in Rhode Island
Hopkinton, Rhode Island
Providence metropolitan area
Villages in Rhode Island
Villages in Washington County, Rhode Island